"Best of Intentions" is a song written and recorded by American country music singer Travis Tritt. It was released in June 2000 as the first single from his album, Down the Road I Go. The song reached the top of the Billboard Hot Country Singles & Tracks chart and peaked at number 27 on the U.S. Billboard Hot 100 chart, his highest charting single to date. It also became Tritt's first Number One single since "Foolish Pride" in 1994, and the last Number One hit of his career.

Content
The song is a ballad in which the narrator discusses about his best intentions which never materialized into the life he had always planned to build for his significant other.

Critical reception
Deborah Evans Price, of Billboard magazine reviewed the song favorably saying that it is a "gorgeous ballad" and that "the song boasts a sweet melody and tender lyric." Price goes on to say that it is a "stirring anthem of devotion that will likely strike a chord with country listeners."

Music video
The music video for "Best of Intentions" was filmed at Tennessee State Penitentiary, where movies such as Marie, Ernest Goes to Jail, Last Dance and The Green Mile were filmed. It features Tritt portraying a prison inmate, scenes also feature him singing the song, and sitting on his stool.

Chart positions
"Best of Intentions" debuted at number 62 on the U.S. Billboard Hot Country Singles & Tracks for the week of July 1, 2000.

Year-end charts

Notes
A  RPM ceased publication on November 13, 2000. The song had not yet reached its peak.

References

2000 singles
Travis Tritt songs
Songs written by Travis Tritt
Song recordings produced by Billy Joe Walker Jr.
Columbia Records singles
2000 songs